Bet on Friendship (literally Element, shampoo, dot and Karel) is a 2021 Czech Comedy film by director Patrik Hartl. It is an adaptation of Hartl's novel by the same name.

Cast
Martin Pechlát as Element
David Švehlík as Shampoo
Hynek Čermák as Dot
Martin Hofmann as Karel
Zuzana Norisová as Lubica
Daniela Kolářová as Dot's mother
Jana Kolesárová as Klára
Kristýna Boková as Saša
Barbora Poláková as Shampoo's assistant
Petra Polnišová as Jarmila
Martina Hekerová as Vitamine miss
Hana Vagnerová as Karolína
Martin Sitta as Dot's colleague
Eva Josefíková as Secretary in Karel's company
Tomáš Maštalír as Max
Ľuboš Kostelný as Gába

References

External links
 

2021 films
Czech comedy films
2020s Czech-language films